Renko is a former municipality of Finland.
Renko may also refer to:

Renko chart, a type of financial chart
the ballet dancer Matthew Renko
the fictional detective Arkady Renko
Steve Renko, baseball player
Ivan Renko, fictitious Yugoslav basketball player
 Officer Andy Renko in Hill Street Blues
Renko, the debut album of Dutch rock band Daryll-Ann